Oliver Camenzind (born 18 January 1972) is a retired Swiss football defender.

References

1972 births
Living people
Swiss men's footballers
FC Luzern players
Association football defenders